Harkins Theatres is an American movie theater chain with locations throughout the Southwestern United States. Harkins Theatres is privately owned and operated by its parent company, Harkins Enterprises, LLC. The company currently operates 33 theaters with 501 screens throughout Arizona, California, Colorado, and Oklahoma.

History

Founding 
In 1931, at the age of sixteen, Dwight "Red" Harkins left Cincinnati, Ohio, on his Harley Davidson motorcycle for Hollywood. Dwight planned to pursue a role in one of the new "talkies." However, by the time he arrived in Tempe, Arizona, he could no longer afford to continue his quest. After several years in Tempe, he decided to pursue a new career operating a movie house.  In 1933, at the age of 18, he opened the State Theatre in Tempe after putting $50 down on the lease to take over the State Theatre, which was originally the Goodwin Opera House that opened in 1907.

Early years 
In 1934, Red Harkins built an outdoor theater in Tempe Beach Park, which lasted for only one summer.
Afterward, in 1940, Harkins built the College Theater (currently Harkins Valley Art). The theater contained innovations such as glow-in-the-dark carpets, headphones for the hearing impaired, and automatic drinking fountains.  The theater is significant in that it is Tempe's only Depression-era theater.

The last theater opened by Red Harkins was the "Camelview 5" theater in 1973. The Camelview 5 closed down in December 2015 and the "Camelview at Fashion Square" location opened as a 14-theater space in the Scottsdale Fashion Square mall.

Dan Harkins 
In 1974, Dwight Harkins died, leaving the company to his wife, Viola. Dwight had 6 children. At that time the company was near bankruptcy. After reworking the company, Dan, Dwight's 4th son, extensively expanded the theatre chain from five locations in the Phoenix, Arizona area to the current 33 locations in four states - Oklahoma, Colorado, Arizona, and Southern California. The Texas Southlake location was operational until November 2, 2020.

Harkins Theatres struggled financially because it was unable to book many first-run movies. In 1977, Dan Harkins filed a lawsuit against a group of film distributors alleging they had prevented Harkins from booking many top first-run movie titles. Movie studios began settling with Harkins. As a result of the lawsuit, Harkins Theatres was able to show a run of the 1940 Walt Disney animated film Fantasia in May 1982, starting a string of successful releases.

Dan Harkins has won several awards for his work in the exhibitor industry and his community involvement. 
Phoenix Film Festival Visionary Award (2010) 
Arizona Culture Keepers (2010)
United Motion Picture Association of America National Showman of the Year (1976, 1980 & 1982) 
American Institute of Architects Community Vision Award (1996)

Expansion
In the early 1990s, Harkins acquired several theaters operated by Mann Theatres. Most of the theaters acquired were a result of a lawsuit.

In 1988, Harkins re-opened the Cine Capri theater in Phoenix. The original Cine Capri was the largest screen in Arizona, measuring more than 70 feet (21 m) long. Despite over 200,000 signatures in a preservation effort led primarily by KTAR's Pat McMahon, the theater was demolished in 1998.

In 2003, a newer version of the Cine Capri theater opened at the Scottsdale 101 14 multiplex. Harkins Theatres also built Cine Capri auditoriums at its Bricktown 16 (Oklahoma City, OK), Northfield 18 (Denver, CO), Southlake 14 (Southlake, TX) and Tempe Marketplace 16 (Tempe, AZ) locations.

In November 2004, Harkins opened its Yuma Palms 14 location in Yuma, Arizona. The first film shown at this location was The Polar Express.

In 2006, Harkins Theatres opened two theaters in California, Moreno Valley 16 (Moreno Valley, CA) and Chino Hills 18 (Chino Hills, CA).
 
Harkins opened two additional California locations, Mountain Grove 16 (Redlands, Ca) and Cerritos 16 (Cerritos, Ca) in 2016.  
Both theaters include "Harkins Ultimate Lounger" recliner chairs, reserved seating, an in Lobby Bar that serves local craft beers and wine, a play center, and a "Cinè 1" theater. The Cinè 1 is a modern incarnation of the Cinè Capri, and features an over 80' foot screen, laser video projection, and Dolby Atmos sound; the Cinè 1 can also seat over 400 guests.

On December 10, 2009, Harkins Theatres began to lease the IMAX theater right next to its own theater at Arizona Mills from IMAX Corporation. The location was immediately renamed "Harkins Arizona Mills Luxury 25 Cinemas with IMAX" and features Arizona's only full sized IMAX screen. The first movie to be shown in the newly acquired theater was James Cameron's Avatar from 20th Century Fox in IMAX 3D.

In May 2013, Harkins reopened the former Tower Theaters in Tucson, Arizona, and renamed it "Harkins Arizona Pavilions 12". The theater holds 12 screens and is currently the second theater in Tucson and the third in southern Arizona.

In December 2015, Harkins merged two of its theaters in Scottsdale, Arizona, while closing two of its former facilities. On December 7, 2015, Harkins closed Fashion Square 7 and on December 10, Camelview 5 was also shut down. Camelview's spirit of independent and art circuit films, plus the running of mainstream movies were brought into the Harkins Camelview at Fashion Square 14 that opened on December 17 prior to the release of Star Wars: The Force Awakens.

"This theater will be a moviegoer's dream come true," said company owner Dan Harkins. "We intend to transplant the soul of our beloved Camelview into this amazing new cinema. Independent, foreign, and art films are a part of our DNA and we are proud to be able to continue and expand Camelview's legacy to include even more films in a dazzling new venue."

Camelview at Fashion Square 14 contains a variety of amenities including more art, independent and foreign films; "Harkins' Ultimate Lounger" plush leather reclining seats; reserved seating; 14 curved, wall-to-wall screens; 4K digital projection and Dolby digital sound; a gourmet concessions stand with an expanded menu including Harkins' award-winning popcorn and a variety of hot food items; Harkins' Lobby Café featuring espresso drinks, desserts and small plates; the "Vérité Lounge", an indoor/outdoor rooftop terrace serving cocktails, wine and beer including local craft favorites, and architecturally minimalist modern movie palace décor.

Temporary 2020 closure
On March 16, 2020, Harkins Theatres temporarily closed all of its movie theaters until the end of the month due to the COVID-19 pandemic. Harkins Theatres has since reopened theatres in Arizona, Colorado, and Oklahoma. The reopening of their theatres is consistent with following the most current and up to date health safety protocols. Safety protocols include, wearing masks (except while eating or drinking in seats), thorough sanitation of theatres, and social distancing.

Exiting The Texas Market
On November 2, 2020, after 15 years of showing the newest releases to movie fans everywhere, Harkins Southlake 14 closed its doors permanently. According to a media release, the theater made the difficult decision to close permanently after management was unable to come to economic terms with the Southlake Town Square landlord. It was the only Harkins theater located in Texas, as its website listed.

Art and independent film
The Harkins Art Film Society brings art and independent films to the theater chain. Harkins Valley Art and Harkins Camelview at Fashion Square 14 are dedicated to foreign and independent films.

Harkins also broadcasts opera and ballet performances throughout the year. These broadcasts include both live and taped ballet performances from around the world.

Harkins Theatres hosts several film festivals each year.

The Phoenix Film Festival – Harkins Theatres Scottsdale 101 (Scottsdale, Arizona)
The Scottsdale International Film Festival – Harkins Theatres Shea 14 (Scottsdale, Arizona)
The Greater Phoenix Jewish Film Festival – Harkins Theatres Camelview at Fashion Square 14 (Scottsdale, Arizona)
DeadCENTER Film Festival – Harkins Theatres Bricktown 16 (Oklahoma City, Oklahoma)

Features 

In 1997, Harkins Theatres Superstition Springs 25 was the first theater in Arizona to obtain THX Certification in all 25 auditoriums.

In 2000, Harkins Theatres began introducing PlayCenters in their theaters, allowing parents to see a movie while their children are in a supervised environment.

In 2011, Harkins Theatres upgraded more than 400 of its screens to digital projection.

Summer Movie Fun (SMF) 
Each summer, Harkins Theatres hosts Summer Movie Fun, which is a summer movie program for children. The program features 10 children's movies from the previous year. Harkins developed the program more than 30 years ago as a way to offer parents an affordable summer activity for children.

Guest Loyalty Program 
Harkins Theatres sells souvenir loyalty cups with a different movie-related theme each year. Customers who purchase a loyalty cup can bring it back to receive $2.00 refills for the year.

Starting in late 2017, Harkins began offering their guests the opportunity to join their new rewards program called My Harkins Awards. This program rewards frequent movie-goers with points on every qualifying purchase. Members of the program also periodically receive promotions and exclusive offers as part of their membership.

Additionally, guests may purchase Popcorn Perks, which entitles them to 36 free medium-sized popcorns in a 12-month period. Harkins previously sold loyalty T-shirts, which allowed guests who wore it to a Harkins to be entitled to receive a free medium-sized popcorn during each visit throughout the year. The Popcorn Perks program replaced the T-shirt program, setting a limit on how many popcorn vouchers a guest may redeem per year to how many "Perks" the guest has purchased. A portion of every Popcorn Perk sold goes to Phoenix Children's Hospital Center for Cancer and Blood Disorders.

Trivia 
Before the opening of each new theater, Dan Harkins and his family have a hand print dedication ceremony similar to that at Grauman's Chinese Theater in Hollywood. He then proceeds to purchase the first ticket.
A premiere of The Bourne Ultimatum was held in downtown Oklahoma City on July 31, 2007, at the Harkins Theatres Bricktown 16 to benefit The Children's Center, located in suburban Bethany. The film was shown simultaneously on three screens. Star Matt Damon was at the event to greet guests.
20th Century Fox held a YouTube contest to determine where the world premiere of X-Men Origins: Wolverine would be held. Tempe, Arizona won the contest and the world premiere of X-Men Origins: Wolverine was held at Harkins Theatres Tempe Marketplace 16 on April 27, 2009.

Main Competitors
AMC Theatres
Cinemark Theatres

References

External links
 Harkins Theatres
 More on Dwight (Red) Harkins

Companies based in Scottsdale, Arizona
Economy of the Southwestern United States
Movie theatre chains in the United States